Hare-um Scare-um is a 1939 Warner Bros. Merrie Melodies cartoon directed by Ben Hardaway and Cal Dalton. The short was released on August 12, 1939, and is the third short to feature the rabbit that would evolve into Bugs Bunny.

The title is a homonym with an old nonsense expression — "harum-scarum", meaning reckless or irresponsible. This was the first use of a hare-based pun title in the Warner Bros. cartoons; it would be a device used to name many Bugs Bunny cartoons in the years to come.

Plot
A man (named as John Sourpuss in the copyright synopsis) reading a newspaper comes across an article stating that meat prices have soared and the consumers are sore. Angry, he declares that he'll hunt his own meat to get back at the government for the price inflation. He takes his dog with him, revealing he is going hunting for rabbits.

In the woods, a rabbit leads the dog into a hollow log and pushes the log down a hill, where it smashes into a tree.  Meanwhile, John sees several rabbits hopping over a hill. He fires his gun several times and runs to where the rabbits were. When he gets there, he finds two spinning wheels with pictures of rabbits on them, giving the perception of moving rabbits.

He then sees the rabbit sleeping. The hunter starts pouring salt on the rabbit's tail. The rabbit quickly gets up and holds a stick of celery under the stream of salt. The rabbit then runs into a cave, and the hunter runs after him. Before he reaches the cave, a pair of elevator doors closes, which the hunter runs into.

The bunny then dresses as a female dog, successfully seducing the hunter's dog. When the dog finally realizes he's with the rabbit rather than another dog, he resumes his chase. The rabbit then pretends he's a policeman, citing the dog for numerous crimes (speeding, running on the wrong side of the street, intoxicated "driving", etc.).

After confusing the dog and running away, the rabbit begins singing a song about how crazy he is. When he finishes his song, he turns to find the hunter with his gun aimed at him. The rabbit, trying to gain sympathy, begs for his life, explaining how poor and sick he is. John begins crying, feeling sorry for the rabbit. Despite this, the rabbit shocks John with a joy buzzer. The hunter then shouts that he can whip the rabbit and his whole family. Suddenly, a large group of rabbits surround John, looking for a fight (see "Notes" below for the true ending).

Home media
LaserDisc – The Golden Age of Looney Tunes, Volume 2, Side 2 (unrestored, without lost ending)
DVD – Invisible Stripes (USA 1995 dubbed print added as a bonus, without lost ending)
Blu-ray and DVD – Looney Tunes Platinum Collection: Volume 2, Disc 2 (lost ending restored)
Streaming - HBO Max

Notes
This cartoon marks the third appearance of Bugs Bunny's predecessor and the first time he, thanks to a redesign by Charlie Thorson, appears as a grey rabbit instead of a white one. 
The rabbit's voice and laugh were identical to those of Woody Woodpecker in his very first appearance (the Andy Panda cartoon "Knock Knock", released the following year). In fact, Mel Blanc voiced Woody Woodpecker for the first year before entering a contract with Warner Bros.
There had been speculation about the real ending of this cartoon, as the version shown on television ends abruptly after the rabbits appear following the hunter threatening to beat up the wacky rabbit and his entire family. On April 27, 2009, animation historian David Gerstein posted a report on his blog that he finally revealed the true ending to this cartoon: the rabbits attack the hunter in a cartoon smoke cloud and then run away. The smoke clears up to show the hunter disheveled. The rabbit returns to give the hunter his busted rifle saying "You oughtta get that fixed. Somebody's liable to get hurt." He then returns to his looney self, bouncing on his head like a pogo stick down the road. The hunter becomes enraged, but then does the same thing the rabbit does. This scene might have been removed because, as Gerstein theorizes, the ending scene was similar to the ending of Tex Avery's "Daffy Duck & Egghead", which was released a year earlier prior to the release of "Hare-um Scare-um". The lost ending was restored on Looney Tunes Platinum Collection: Volume 2.

References

External links
 
 

1939 films
1939 short films
1939 animated films
Merrie Melodies short films
Bugs Bunny films
Films about hunters
Films directed by Ben Hardaway
Films directed by Cal Dalton
Films produced by Leon Schlesinger
1930s Warner Bros. animated short films